Kim Hyun-jong (Hanja: 金鉉宗, born 27 September 1959 in Seoul) is a former minister for trade under Presidents Roh Moo-hyun and Moon Jae-in.

From May 2003, the very beginning of the Roh administration, as the deputy minister for trade and later the minister for trade, he was one of the most central figures in Roh administration's trade policy for more than 4 years. In particular, he initiated numerous free trade agreement(FTA) plans or talks with Canada, India (CEPA), Mexico, MERCOSUR, GCC, Singapore, EFTA, ASEAN, and United States. The FTAs with Singapore, EFTA, ASEAN, and USA had been signed before he moved to UN. These 4 blocks and Chile (the first nation with which South Korean signed FTA) compose 25.78% of all South Korean trade (according to data in 2006).  

Under President Moon, Kim served as his first Trade Minister. He led the re-negotiation of the KORUS FTA. In 2019 he was reshuffled to Office of National Security as its Deputy Director responsible for coordinating foreign and inter-korean policies. In 2021 he was again reshuffled to President Moon's Special Advisor on foreign policy. 

He also took various roles representing South Korean government at the WTO, UN and APEC.  

Moreover, he previously worked for Milbank LLP, Skadden, Yoon & Yang LLC (then-Kim Shin & Yu) and Samsung Electronics. 

He taught international trade at South Korean universities - Hongik University and Hankuk University of Foreign Studies.

He holds three degrees from Columbia University: B.A. (1981) and M.A. (1982) in Political Science and a J.D. (1985) from Columbia Law School in New York. He also graduated from Wilbraham & Monson Academy in Massachusetts in 1977.

Honors 

 Order of Service Merit by the government of South Korea (2009)

Publications
 The Trend of Block Economy and NAFTA (1995)
 When are Government Loans Subsidies? Hanbo Steel and the Application of the WTO Subsidies Agreement (1998)

See also
 Republic of Korea-United States Free Trade Agreement (KORUS)
List of Free Trade Agreements

References 

1959 births
Living people
South Korean diplomats
20th-century South Korean lawyers
Permanent Representatives of South Korea to the United Nations

Academic staff of Hongik University
Academic staff of Hankuk University of Foreign Studies
Columbia Law School alumni
Trade ministers of South Korea
South Korean government officials
Columbia College (New York) alumni
Columbia Graduate School of Arts and Sciences alumni
Wilbraham & Monson Academy alumni
Skadden, Arps, Slate, Meagher & Flom people